A by-election for the seat of Wanguri in the Northern Territory Legislative Assembly was held on 16 February 2013. The by-election was triggered by the resignation of Labor Party (ALP) member and former Chief Minister of the Northern Territory Paul Henderson on 25 January 2013, following the defeat of Henderson's government at the 2012 territory election.

Candidates
Nominations for the by-election closed on 1 February 2013. Rhianna Harker, who contested Wanguri at the 2012 general election, was endorsed by the Country Liberal Party as its candidate. The Australian Labor Party candidate was Nicole Manison. Peter Rudge contested the by-election as an independent candidate—he had previously stood as a candidate for Nightcliff in the 2012 election.

Results

References

External links
Division of Wanguri (Northern Territory Electoral Commission)
Antony Green: 2013 Wanguri by-election (Australian Broadcasting Corporation)

2013 elections in Australia
Northern Territory by-elections
2010s in the Northern Territory
February 2013 events in Australia